IRDC (Iraq Reconstruction and Development Council) was a group of 150 Iraqi expatriates —most of whom were American citizens— recruited by the Pentagon in March 2003 to assist the Coalition Forces with post-war reconstruction planning after the second Gulf War. The group was headed by Emad Dhia, a former Pfizer Corporation executive. The group was supervised by Abram Shulsky's Office of Special Plans unit in the Pentagon. The 130 or so exiled Iraqi included professionals, academicians and technocrats who joined the IRDC worked as advisors for the senior advisors of the Coalition Provisional Authority.

The group was the brainchild of Deputy Secretary Paul Wolfowitz and Under Secretary Douglas Feith to bolster cultural awareness and Iraqi outreach. First ORHA and then the CPA used the IRDC's members as technical advisors to Iraq's ministries and provincial offices. Some CPA officials had concerns that some IRDC members brought potentially troublesome political baggage with them, including ties to factions controlled by exile politicians.

The group was later marginalized and sidelined by Americans who view them as foot soldiers rather than partners in policy-making and left shortly after deployment in 2003.

The group was dissolved in June 2004 and some of its members preferred to stay in Iraq.

Some prominent IRDC members:
 Emad Dhia - Director
 Ghanim El Shibly - Ministry of Foreign Affairs
 Sinan Al Shibibi - Central Bank of Iraq
 Sami al-Askari - Baghdad Central and Ministry of Religious Affairs
 Dr Muhammed Al Rubaei - Ministry of Higher Education
 Dr Muhammed Al Najim - Ministry of Higher Education
 Bassim Hilmi
 Adel Rahumi - Baghdad Central
 Dr Hassan Al Janabi - Ministry of Irrigation
 Tawfiq Al Yasiri - Ministry of Interior
 Ibrahim Al Zubaidi - Ministry of Culture
 Ibrahim Ahmed - Ministry of Culture
 George Bakos - Baghdad Central
 Dr Ghassan Ibrahim - Ministry of Electricity
 Abud Khadim - Ministry of Sports and Youth
 Harry Habib - Ministry of Electricity/Baghdad Central
 Hamid Al Kifaei - Ministry of Culture
 Lamya'a Al Gailani - Ministry of Culture
 Mohammad Abdul Jabbar Al-Shaboot. Ministry of Culture

References

Coalition Provisional Authority